Fred Baldwin is an American politician and a Republican member of the Wyoming Senate representing District 14 since January 10, 2017.

Elections

2014
After incumbent Republican Representative Kathy Davison announced her retirement, Baldwin announced his candidacy.  He defeated Lyle Williams in the Republican primary with 70% of the vote.  Baldwin faced Democratic candidate Michele Irwin in the general election and defeated Irwin, 76% to 24%.

2016
State Senator Stan Cooper announced he would not run for re-election in May 2016.  Baldwin announced his candidacy shortly thereafter, and defeated Republican Don Lamborn in the August primary.  Baldwin defeated Democratic candidate Charlotte Sedey in the general election with 85% of the vote.

References

External links
Official page at the Wyoming Legislature
Profile from Ballotpedia

Living people
Republican Party members of the Wyoming House of Representatives
Casper College alumni
University of Utah alumni
People from Kemmerer, Wyoming
21st-century American politicians
People from Afton, Wyoming
Year of birth missing (living people)